Municipal elections were held in Finland on 28 October 2012, with advance voting between 17 and 23 October 2012. 9,674 municipal council seats were open for election in 304 municipalities. The number of councillors decreased by over 700 compared to the previous election due to the merging of several municipalities. The term of the elected councillors will begin on 1 January 2013.

Funds 
In Finland, candidates have to declare their campaign funding. 15% of the declarations did not arrive in time.

Competing parties

 Centre Party
 National Coalition Party (NCP)
 Social Democratic Party (SDP)
 True Finns
 Green League
 Left Alliance
 Swedish People's Party (SPP)
 Christian Democrats
 Pirate Party
 Communist Party
 Change 2011
 Independence Party
 Workers Party
 Communist Workers' Party – For Peace and Socialism
 For the Poor
 Freedom Party

Electoral method

The D'Hondt method is used in the election. The size of the municipal council or city council depends on the population of the municipality:

Helsinki is the only city in the last category and Espoo the only city in the second-to-last category.

National results

Turnout was 58.3%, lower than in the previous municipal election.

References

External links
 The Elections website of the Ministry of Justice

Municipal elections in Finland
2012 elections in Finland
October 2012 events in Europe